The MDR-3  (a.k.a.11) was a long-range flying boat designed and built in the USSR from  1931.

Development 
In 1931, Chyetverikov was commissioned to design a new long-range flying boat for MA (Morskaya Aviatsiya – naval aviation). Chyetverikov used few new parts, borrowing wings, tailplane and engine nacelles (mounted above the wing) from the Grigorovich TB-5 and a scaled-up Grigorovich ROM-2 fuselage. The use of ready designed or built components led to quick construction of the prototype which was ready for flight tests in Dec 1931. These commenced in January 1932 after the aircraft was transported to Sevastopol in the Crimea. Despite fast construction and excellent structural qualities, results of the flight tests were disappointing. Takeoff time was 36 seconds, climb rate less than a metre per second and the ceiling was only 2,200m. As a result project was transferred to KOSOS (Konstrooktorskiy Otdel Sektora Opytnovo Stroitel'stva – section of experimental aeroplane construction), as there was a lack of faith in Chyetverikov's abilities to rectify the poor performance.
The MDR-3 became the basis of the ANT-27, MDR-4 and MTB-1.

Specifications (MDR-3)

See also
List of flying boats and floatplanes
 Short Knuckleduster

References

 Gunston, Bill. “The Osprey Encyclopaedia of Russian Aircraft 1875–1995”. London, Osprey. 1995. 
 Taylor, Michael J.H. . “ Jane's Encyclopedia of Aviation. Studio Editions. London. 1989.  

1930s Soviet patrol aircraft
Flying boats
MDR-3
High-wing aircraft
Four-engined push-pull aircraft
Aircraft first flown in 1936
Twin-tail aircraft